= Araukome =

Town of ancient Phrygia

Coordinates: 39°09′16″N 30°02′24″E

Araukome was a town of ancient Phrygia, inhabited in Byzantine times.

Its site is tentatively located near Eymir in Asiatic Turkey.
